Priscilla Ann Quintana is an American actress and model. Quintana stars in The CW science fiction series Pandora as Jacqueline "Jax" Zhou, and has the recurring role of Isabella on Freeform's Good Trouble.

Early life
Quintana is from Downey, California. Her mother found time to help out pregnant teen girls that had been thrown out of their homes.  This, combined with her maternal grandparents' work rehabilitating female drug addicts, formed Quintana's core values of community service.  She remembers a Christmas tradition of her family volunteering at soup kitchens, helping feed the homeless.

After spending her early years around the entertainment industry in Southern California, Quintana decided to study the business side of movie making.  She won a scholarship to film school, helping support herself by waitressing. It was during this period she was approached by a modeling agency, and Quintana decided to move to Los Angeles to pursue this new opportunity.

Career
While booking modelling jobs, Quintana also started getting offers for acting roles in commercials. This quickly led to small acting roles in television and films.  Among these were a couple of uncredited parts as a Casino Hostess in The Gambler (2014) and as a Foam Girl in Fast & Furious 7 (2015).  Bigger parts followed, and in 2017 Quintana landed a major supporting role in Polaroid (2019), where she met and starting dating her on-screen boyfriend, Keenan Tracey.

In 2018, Quintana was cast as lead Jacqueline "Jax" Zhou, in The CW science fiction series Pandora.  In January 2020, it was announced that Quintana would also have a recurring role as Isabella, in Freeform's Good Trouble.

Charity work
Quintana has a particular soft spot for animals, and began fostering homeless dogs that would otherwise be euthanized.  She would nurse them back to health, and find them new Forever Homes, all out of her own pocket.  While filming Pandora in Bulgaria, she decided to save many of the stray dogs she met, by bringing them back to the United States.  Quintana now continues this work by volunteering with the like-minded, LA-based rescue organization Wag and Walks.

Personal life 
Quintana has said she is of Native American and castizo Mexican descent, but does not know whether it is proper to call her a person of color due to her light complexion, which allows her to pass for white. Quintana is highly sensitive to roles' cultural sensitivity as a result of her heritage, and advocates that more characters be played by performers of their background.

Filmography

Film

Television

Commercials

References

External links 
 
 
Priscilla Quintana at Otto Models

1992 births
Living people
21st-century American actresses
Actresses from California
American actresses of Mexican descent
Female models from California
Hispanic and Latino American actresses
Hispanic and Latino American female models
American people of Native American descent